The strike wave of 1945–1946 (also called the great strike wave of 1946) was a series of massive post-war labor strikes after World War II from 1945 to 1946 in the United States spanning numerous industries and public utilities. In the year after V-J Day, more than five million American workers were involved in strikes, which lasted on average four times longer than those during the war.  They were the largest strikes in American labor history. Other strikes occurred across the world including in Europe and colonial Africa.

Background
Throughout the Second World War, the National War Labor Board gave trade unions the responsibility for maintaining labor discipline in exchange for closed membership. This led to acquiescence on the part of labor leaders to businesses and various wildcat strikes on the part of the workers. The strikes were largely a result of tumultuous postwar economic adjustments; with 10 million soldiers returning home, and the transfer of people from wartime sectors to traditional sectors, inflation was 8% in 1945, 14% in 1946, and 8% in 1947. Many of the protests from 1945 to 1946 were for better pay and working hours, but only one study done by Jerome F. Scott and George C. Homans of 118 strikes in Detroit from 1944 to 1945, found that only four were for wages, with the rest being for discipline, company policies or firings.

The strikes
After the war, wages fell across the board, leading to large strikes. Strikes in 1945 included:

 10,500 film crew workers (March 1945)
 43,000 oil workers (October 1945)
 225,000 United Auto Workers (November 1945)

In 1946, strikes increased:

 174,000 electric workers (January 1946)
 93,000 meatpackers (January 1946)
 750,000 steel workers (January 1946)
 340,000 coal miners (April 1946)
 250,000 railroad engineers and trainmen nationwide (May 22–25, 1946)
 120,000 miners, rail and steel workers in the Pittsburgh region. (December 1946)

Others included strikes of railroad workers and "general strikes in Lancaster, Pennsylvania; Stamford, Connecticut; Rochester, New York; and Oakland, California. In total, 4.3 million workers participated in the strikes. According to Jeremy Brecher, they were "the closest thing to a national general strike of industry in the twentieth century."

Aftermath
In 1947, Congress responded to the strike wave by enacting, over President Truman's veto, the Taft–Hartley Act, restricting the powers and activities of labor unions. The strike also caused a rally in support for the Labour Party, prior to the 1945 United Kingdom general election.

See also

 Winter of Discontent, similar period of widespread strikes in 1978–1979 Great Britain that led to the election of a Conservative government that passed new restrictions on union activities

References

External links
 Newsreel May 23, 1946: Rail strike paralyzes the nation
 Newsreel May 29, 1946: end of coal strike

General strikes in the United States
Labor disputes in the United States
1945 in the United States
1946 in the United States